Ibán Parra López (born 18 October 1977 in Lleida, Catalonia) is a Spanish footballer, striker.

External links

1977 births
Living people
Sportspeople from Lleida
Spanish footballers
Footballers from Catalonia
Association football forwards
Segunda División B players
Tercera División players
CF Balaguer footballers
UE Lleida players
Veikkausliiga players
Tampere United players
FC Santa Coloma players
Spanish expatriate footballers
Expatriate footballers in Italy
Expatriate footballers in Finland
Expatriate footballers in Andorra
Spanish expatriate sportspeople in Italy